James Scott McCallum (born May 2, 1950) is an American businessman and former politician. A member of the Republican Party, he was the 43rd governor of Wisconsin, ascending from the Lieutenant Governorship when Tommy Thompson resigned in 2001 to accept appointment as U.S. Secretary of Health and Human Services. Prior to becoming Governor, McCallum served 14 years as Thompson's Lieutenant Governor and 10 years in the Wisconsin State Senate.

Early life and education
James Scott McCallum was born in Fond du Lac, Wisconsin, the eldest of four children. His father worked as a construction worker and his mother was a homemaker and bank teller. In 1967, he attended a youth leadership program, Badger Boys State, as a representative chosen from Lowell P. Goodrich High School.

He graduated from Macalester College in 1972 with a degree in economics and political science. He earned his master's degree in international economics from Johns Hopkins University in 1974. He earned a PhD from the University of Wisconsin-Milwaukee. He is of the Christian Science religion. McCallum is married to Laurie McCallum; they have three children and reside in Lodi, Wisconsin.

Political career

Early career
In 1976 at the age of 26, McCallum won a seat in the Wisconsin State Senate, defeating a 20-year incumbent. McCallum won the Republican nomination for the United States Senate in 1982, but lost in the general election to incumbent William Proxmire. During his 10 years (1976–1986) as state senator, McCallum was allied with the New Republican Conference, a now-defunct movement of fiscally conservative, but socially liberal, GOP activists. McCallum's legislative accomplishments included increasing penalties for drunk driving offenses and assaults on prison guards; creating a health insurance risk pool for people considered uninsurable; sunsetting outdated legislation; and indexing individual income taxes to account for inflation.

Lieutenant Governor and Governor of Wisconsin
In 1986, McCallum ran for lieutenant governor on the Republican ticket with Tommy Thompson, who was running for governor; both candidates won. McCallum chaired the National Council of Lieutenant Governors and was appointed to the Environmental Protection Agency's advisory council by President George H. W. Bush. The Thompson-McCallum ticket served the state of Wisconsin for 14 years, having been reelected in 1990, 1994 and 1998. In 2001, President George W. Bush appointed Thompson to be Secretary of Health and Human Services. McCallum thus served out the final two years of Thompson's fourth term, and appointed State Senator Margaret Farrow of Pewaukee, Wisconsin, to be the state's first female lieutenant governor.

As the Wisconsin governor, McCallum was cited by the Wall Street Journal during the economic slowdown in 2001 as being one of the 'political tough guys' for balancing the budget without raising taxes. As a governor he was commander-in-chief of the Wisconsin National Guard, directing emergency operations following the September 11 attacks, which resulted in his receiving the 2002 U.S. National Guard Award for his work.

In 2001, McCallum launched "Invest Wisconsin," a new program to focus on the needs of state businesses and communities for investment capital. The public and private partnership was designed to increase awareness of business financing options by engaging statewide networks and professional associations.

As governor he created the Department of Electronic Government and the state's first CIO through consolidation of various departments. This action saved $50 million in first year while expanding service. Today, the department is known as the "Division of Enterprise Technology" of the Wisconsin Department of Administration. Governor McCallum aggressively used the veto pen to cut expenditures throughout his time in office. It was estimated that Wisconsin taxpayers saved $62.9 million through this action. McCallum ran for a full term in 2002, but was defeated in the election by Democratic Attorney General Jim Doyle. The other major party candidate running in 2002 was Libertarian Ed Thompson (brother of Tommy Thompson).

Post-political career
After his public sector service, McCallum was president and CEO of Aidmatrix for nine years. The company is a non-profit based in Texas that matches charitable corporate donations of surplus food and supplies with organizations that need them. Currently, Governor McCallum owns and operates The McCallum Group, a consulting firm in the State of Wisconsin.

McCallum was named a senior fellow at the Discovery Institute. He is also an adjunct professor and honorary fellow in the School of Public Health and Medicine at the University of Wisconsin–Madison. McCallum has also taught executive MBA marketing courses at Sun Yat-sen University and Harbin University.

In March 2013, McCallum was named by Government Technology magazine as one of the "Top 25 Doers, Dreamers, and Drivers" in US technology. McCallum has also received the 21st Century Achievement Award from Computerworld, the Distinguished Citizen Award from Macalester College, and the Ernst and Young Entrepreneur of the Year Award.

McCallum is now an adjunct professor of Public Affairs at the University of Wisconsin-Madison's La Follette School of Public Affairs and the University of Wisconsin-Milwaukee.

Electoral history

Wisconsin Senate (1976, 1980)

| colspan="6" style="text-align:center;background-color: #e9e9e9;"| Primary election, September 14, 1976

| colspan="6" style="text-align:center;background-color: #e9e9e9;"| General election, November 2, 1976

| colspan="6" style="text-align:center;background-color: #e9e9e9;"| Primary election, September 9, 1980

| colspan="6" style="text-align:center;background-color: #e9e9e9;"| General election, November 2, 1976

United States Senate (1982)

| colspan="6" style="text-align:center;background-color: #e9e9e9;"| Primary election, September 14, 1982

| colspan="6" style="text-align:center;background-color: #e9e9e9;"| General election, November 2, 1982

Wisconsin Senate (1984)

| colspan="6" style="text-align:center;background-color: #e9e9e9;"| Primary election, September 11, 1984

| colspan="6" style="text-align:center;background-color: #e9e9e9;"| General election, November 6, 1984

Wisconsin Lieutenant Governor (1986)

| colspan="6" style="text-align:center;background-color: #e9e9e9;"| Lieutenant Governor primary election, September 9, 1986

| colspan="6" style="text-align:center;background-color: #e9e9e9;"| General election, November 4, 1986

Wisconsin Governor (2002)

| colspan="6" style="text-align:center;background-color: #e9e9e9;"| General election, November 5, 2002

See also

Northeast Wisconsin Economic Development Partnership

References

External links

|-

|-

|-

|-

1950 births
American Christian Scientists
Republican Party governors of Wisconsin
Lieutenant Governors of Wisconsin
Living people
Republican Party Wisconsin state senators
Politicians from Fond du Lac, Wisconsin
People from Lodi, Wisconsin
Macalester College alumni
Johns Hopkins University alumni